An entity to be named the European Political Community (EPC) was proposed in 1952 as a combination of the existing European Coal and Steel Community (ECSC) and the proposed European Defence Community (EDC). A draft EPC treaty, as drawn up by the ECSC assembly (now the European Parliament), would have seen a directly elected assembly ("the Peoples’ Chamber"), a senate appointed by national parliaments and a supranational executive accountable to the parliament.

The European Political Community project failed in 1954 when it became clear that the European Defence Community would not be ratified by the French national assembly, which feared that the project entailed an unacceptable loss of national sovereignty. As a result, the European Political Community idea had to be abandoned.

Following the collapse of the EPC, European leaders met in the Messina Conference in 1955 and established the Spaak Committee which would pave the way for the creation of the European Economic Community (EEC).

See also
Messina Conference
History of the European Union
European Defence Community
European political cooperation

References

External links
 The European Political Community on CVCE (Centre for European Studies)

History of the European Union
1952 in Europe